Meyer Stanley Balter, MD, FRCPC, FACP, FCCP (born December 26, 1954) is a Canadian physician specializing in asthma, sarcoidosis and chronic obstructive pulmonary disease (COPD). 

He earned an M.D. from McGill University Faculty of Medicine (1981).   He became a Fellow of the Royal College of Physicians and Surgeons of Canada in 1989.  He currently is Director, Asthma Education Clinic and Director, Internal Medicine Residency Training Program at Mount Sinai Hospital (Toronto), and Professor of Medicine, University of Toronto.

Clinical activities 
Asthma (Education Clinic at Mount Sinai Hospital, co-author of Canadian Guidelines)
COPD (principal author, Canadian AECB Guidelines, co-author of Canadian COPD Guidelines)
Sarcoidosis Clinic

Current local, provincial, national and international activities 
CTS COPD Guidelines Committee
CTS Canadian Respiratory Guidelines Committee (CRGC)

References

External links
 PubMed search for Meyer S. Balter
 Canadian COPD Guidelines

Canadian medical researchers
Canadian pulmonologists
People from Montreal
Academic staff of the University of Toronto
1954 births
Living people
McGill University Faculty of Medicine alumni
Fellows of the Royal College of Physicians and Surgeons of Canada
20th-century Canadian physicians
21st-century Canadian physicians
Fellows of the American College of Physicians